Collyns Ambassa Laokandi (born 9 October 1995) is a Chadian professional footballer who plays as a defender for Régional 1 club Cormontreuil FC.

Career

Laokandi, who moved to France at the age of eight, started his career with the reserves of French Ligue 1 side Reims. After that, he played college soccer in the United States, where he said "it's completely different from France. Here, it's work, work, work... Because if you don't get good grades, you don't play. You have no choice. In France, there are a lot of individualities, there, everyone plays and defends together. They are very focused on the physical, more than the technique." In 2017, Laokandi signed for American club New York Red Bulls U-23. In 2019, he signed for French amateur club Cormontreuil FC.

References

External links
 
 Collyns Laokandi at playmakerstats.com

Living people
1995 births
Chadian footballers
Chad international footballers
Association football defenders
Chadian expatriate footballers
Chadian expatriate sportspeople in the United States
Expatriate soccer players in the United States
St. Francis Brooklyn Terriers men's soccer players
Southern New Hampshire Penmen men's soccer players
Championnat National 3 players
Naturalized citizens of France
French sportspeople of Chadian descent
Black French sportspeople
Chadian emigrants to France
People from N'Djamena
Régional 1 players